Aniksha is a Canadian short drama film, directed by Vincent Toi and released in 2020. The film stars Neeshi Beeharry as Aniksha, a young woman in Mauritius who is caught between tradition and modernity when she takes a job at a call centre soon after entering into an arranged marriage.

The film premiered at the 2020 Toronto International Film Festival.  It was named to TIFF's year-end Canada's Top Ten list for short films in 2020.

The film received a Prix Iris nomination for Best Live Action Short Film at the 23rd Quebec Cinema Awards in 2021.

References

External links

2020 films
2020 short films
Films shot in Mauritius
Films set in Mauritius
Films about Asian Canadians
2020 drama films
2020s French-language films
French-language Canadian films
Canadian drama short films
2020s Canadian films